Daniel Seagrave (born 1970) is a British artist, who created many record covers for death metal bands especially in the early 1990s. He lives in Toronto, Ontario, Canada. He grew up in Ravenshead, near Nottingham.

Seagrave's works are typically highly detailed.

Seagrave is a self-taught painter. He also works on mural designs and sells his art as posters.

List of works
 Becoming the Archetype - Terminate Damnation (2005)
 Becoming the Archetype - Celestial Completion (2011)
 Becoming the Archetype - I Am (2012)
 Becoming the Archetype - Children of the Great Extinction (2022)
 Benediction - Transcend the Rubicon (1993)
 Carnage - Dark Recollections (1990)
 Conspiracy - Reincarnated (2006)
 Conspiracy - Concordat (2009)
 Decrepit Birth - ...And Time Begins (2003)
 Decrepit Birth - Diminishing Between Worlds (2008)
 Decrepit Birth - Polarity (2010)
 Demon Hunter - The Triptych (2005)
 Demon Hunter - The World Is a Thorn (2010)
 Demon Hunter - Exile (2022)
 The Devil Wears Prada - With Roots Above and Branches Below (2009)
 The Devil Wears Prada - Dead Throne (2011)
 The Devil Wears Prada - The Act (2019)
 Dismember - Like an Ever Flowing Stream (1991)
 Dismember - Where Ironcrosses Grow (2004)
 Dismember - The God That Never Was (2006)
 Edge of Sanity - The Spectral Sorrows (1993)
 Entombed - Left Hand Path (1990)
 Entombed - Clandestine (1991)
 Evocation - Tales from the Tomb (2007)
 Funebrarum - Dormant Hallucination (2003)
 Gorguts - Considered Dead (1991)
 Gorguts - The Erosion of Sanity (1993)
 Hypocrisy - Penetralia (1992)
 Landmine Marathon - Sovereign Descent (2010)
 Lawnmower Deth / Metal Duck - Mower Liberation Front / Quack 'Em All (1989)
 Lawnmower Deth - Oh Crickey, It's (1990)
 Lawnmower Deth - The Return of the Fabulous Metal Bozo Clowns (1992)
 Malevolent Creation - The Ten Commandments (1991)
 Malevolent Creation - Retribution (1992)
 Malevolent Creation - Stillborn (1993)
 Monstrosity - Imperial Doom (1992)
 Morbid Angel - Altars of Madness (1989)
 Morbid Angel - Gateways to Annihilation (2000)
 Nocturnus - The Key (1990)
 Pestilence - Testimony of the Ancients (1991)
 Pestilence - Spheres (1993)
 Pestilence - Mind Reflections (1994)
 Rivers of Nihil - The Conscious Seed of Light (2013)
 Rivers of Nihil - Monarchy (2015)
 Rivers of Nihil - Where Owls Know My Name (2018)
Rivers of Nihil - The Work (2021)
 Seance - Fornever Laid to Rest (1992)
 Suffocation - Effigy of the Forgotten (1991)
 Suffocation - Breeding the Spawn (1993)
 Suffocation - Souls to Deny (2004)
 Vader - The Ultimate Incantation (1992)
 Various Artists - At Death's Door (1990)
 Various Artists - Death is just the Beginning II (1992)
 Various Artists - Masters of Misery: An Earache Tribute to Black Sabbath (1992)
 The Vision Bleak - The Unknown (2016)
 Warbringer - Waking into Nightmares (2009)
 Warbringer - Worlds Torn Asunder (2011)
 Xibalba - Hasta La Muerte (2012)

Source:

References

External links
 

Living people
Albums with cover art by Dan Seagrave
Album-cover and concert-poster artists
1971 births
British artists
People from Gedling (district)